Kolkata–Silghat Town Kaziranga Express is an Express train belonging to Eastern Railway zone that runs between  and Silghat Town in India. It is currently being operated with 13181/13182 train numbers on a weekly basis.

The train is named after Kaziranga National Park of Assam, which is famous for the great one-horned rhinoceroses.

Route
 
 
 
 
 
 New Jalpaiguri (Siliguri)
 
 
 
 
 
 
 Jagiroad
 
 Nagaon
 Jaklabandha
 Silghat Town

Locomotive

Service
The 13181/Kolkata–Silghat Town Kaziranga Express has an average speed of 49 km/hr and covers 1175 km in 23h 55m. The 13182/Silghat Town–Kolkata Kaziranga Express has an average speed of 50 km/hr and covers 1359 km in 23h 20m.

Rake sharing

The train shares its rake with 13167/13168 Kolkata–Agra Cantonment Express.

References

External links 

 Kolkata–Silghat Town Kaziranga Express India Rail Info
 Silghat Town–Kolkata Kaziranga Express India Rail Info

Transport in Kolkata
Express trains in India
Rail transport in West Bengal
Rail transport in Assam
Named passenger trains of India